Posta may refer to:

Places 
 Posta, Burrabazar, a neighbourhood in Kolkata
 Posta, Lazio, a comune (municipality), in the Province of Rieti in the Italian region Lazio
 Posta, Pirna, part of the town of Pirna in the Sächsische Schweiz, district of the Free State of Saxony, Germany
 Posta, the central business district of Dar-es-Salaam, Tanzania
 Posta Fibreno, comune (municipality) in the Province of Frosinone in the Italian region Lazio
 Posta River, a tributary of the Arieş River in Romania
 Posta Ybycua, a division (compañía) of the city Capiatá in Central Department, Paraguay
 Piz Posta Biala, a mountain of the Glarus Alps, located north of Sumvitg in the canton of Graubünden
 Posta del Chuy, a historic inn situated 12 kilometres (7.5 mi) away from Melo, Cerro Largo, Uruguay

Postal services 
 Posta Kenya, the postal corporation of Kenya
 Posta (company), the postal service of the Faroe Islands
 Posta e Kosovës, company responsible for postal service in Kosovo
 Poșta Moldovei, company responsible for postal service in Moldova
 Poșta Română, the national operator in the field of postal services in Romania
 Magyar Posta, the postal administration of Hungary
 Posta Uganda, the company solely responsible for postal service in Uganda
 Posta Shqiptare, the national postal service of Albania

People 
 Sándor Pósta (1888–1952), Hungarian fencer and Olympic champion in the sabre competition
 Adrienne Posta (born 1948), English actress and singer

Other uses 
 Posta sudada, traditional Colombian cuisine meat dish, particularly of Antioqueña
 Posta Rangers F.C., Kenyan professional football club, based in Nairobi
 Posta seeds, another name for Khas khas (Opium poppy) seeds, used mainly in cooking in India
 Posta (newspaper), a popular Turkish tabloid
 Posta Sandstone

See also 
 La Posta Mountain Warfare Training Facility
 La Posta Band of Diegueno Mission Indians
 La Posta Astro-Geophysical Observatory
 Poșta (disambiguation)